Jacques Chessex (Payerne, 1 March 1934 – Yverdon-les-Bains, 9 October 2009) was a Swiss author and painter.

Biography 
Chessex was born in 1934 in Payerne. From 1951 to 1953, he studied at Collège Saint-Michel in Fribourg, before undertaking literature studies in Lausanne. In 1953, he co-founded the literary review Pays du Lac in Pully. In 1956, Chessex's father committed suicide, making a lasting impression on him. He completed his studies in 1960.

In 1963, Chessex was awarded the Schiller Prize for La Tête ouverte. The next year, he co-founded the literary review Écriture in Lausanne. From 1969, he held a position as a French literature professor in the Gymnase de la Cité in Lausanne.

In 1972, he was awarded the Alpes-Jura prize. The next year, he obtained the Prix Goncourt for the novel L'Ogre. It was translated by Martin Sokolinsky and published in 1975 under the title A Father's Love and reissued in 2012 under a new title The Tyrant. In 1992, he obtained the Mallarmé Prize for poetry for  Les Aveugles du seul regard, as well as the Grand Prize of the Fondation Vaudoise  pour la création artistique. In 1999, he was awarded the Grand Prix de la langue française, and the Goncourt poetry grant for Allegria.

In 2007, he was awarded the Grand Prix Jean Giono for his entire work.

One of Chessex's last books A Jew Must Die, published 2008, focussed on the 1942 death of cattle trader Arthur Bloch, who was killed by Swiss Nazis in Chessex's home town of Payerne. The novel, like others in his back catalogue, was not warmly received in Switzerland. A play adapted from his 1967 novel The Confession of Father Burg had just had its premiere the night before his death.

Chessex suffered a heart attack and collapsed during a public discussion in Yverdon-les-Bains on 9 October 2009 about a play The Confession of Father Burg, and about his support for Roman Polanski (who was arrested in September 2009 by Swiss police because of his outstanding U.S. warrant when he entered the country to accept a Lifetime Achievement Award at the Zurich Film Festival). He died shortly thereafter. His literary estate is archived in the Swiss Literary Archives in Bern.

Works

Poetry
Le Jour proche, Aux Miroirs partagés, Lausanne, 1954.
Chant de printemps, Jeune Poésie, Genève, 1955.
Une Voix la nuit, Mermod, Lausanne, 1957.
Batailles dans l'air (1957–1959), Mermod, 1959.
Le Jeûne de huit nuits, Payot, Lausanne, 1966.
L'Ouvert obscur, L'Age d'Homme, Lausanne, 1967.
Elégie soleil du regret, Bertil Galland, Vevey, 1976.
Le Calviniste, Grasset, Paris, 1983.
Pierre Estoppey, Le Verseau, Lausanne, 1986.
Myriam, PAP, Pully, 1987.
Comme l'os, Grasset, 1988.
Dans la Page brumeuse du sonnet, PAP, 1989.
Elégie de Pâques, PAP, 1989.
Neige, Stamperia del Portico, Gavirate, 1989.
Si l'Arc des coqs, PAP, 1989.
Plaie ravie, PAP, 1989.
Les Aveugles du seul regard, PAP, 1991. Autre édition: La Différence, Paris, 1992.
Le Buisson, Atelier de St-Prex, 1991.
Songe du Corps élémentaire, Simecek et Ditesheim, Lausanne et Neuchâtel, 1992.
La Fente, Atelier de St-Prex, 1993.
Le Rire dans la faille, Le Manoir, Martigny, 1993.
Les Elégies de Yorick, Bernard Campiche, Yvonand, 1994.
Le Temps sans Temps", Le Cherche-Midi, Paris, 1995.Cantique, poésie, Bernard Campiche, 1996.Poésie, 3 vol. (L'œuvre), Bernard Campiche, 1997.Le désir de la neige, Grasset, 2002.Allegria, Grasset, 2005.Revanche des purs, Grasset, 2008.

NovelsLa Tête ouverte, Gallimard, Paris, 1962.La Confession du pasteur Burg, Christian Bourgois, Paris, 1967.Carabas, Grasset, Paris, 1971.L'Ogre, Grasset, 1973. Prix GoncourtL'Ardent royaume, Grasset, 1975.Les Yeux jaunes, Grasset, 1979.Judas le transparent, Grasset, 1982.Jonas, Grasset, 1987.Morgane madrigal, Grasset, 1990.La Trinité, Grasset, 1992.Le rêve de Voltaire, Grasset, 1995.La mort d'un juste  Grasset, 1996.L'imitation, Grasset, 1998.Portrait d'une ombre, Zoé, Genève, 1999Incarnata, Grasset, 1999Monsieur, Grasset, 2001L'economie du Ciel, Grasset, 2003L'Eternel sentit une odeur agréable, Grasset, 2004Avant le Matin, Grasset 2006Le Vampire de Ropraz, Grasset, 2007Pardon mère, Grasset, 2008, Grasset, 2009Le Dernier crâne de M. de Sade, Grasset, 2010

Short storiesLe Séjour des morts, Grasset, 1977.Où vont mourir les oiseaux, Grasset, 1980.Sosie d'un saint, Grasset, 2000.

 Epics Reste avec nous, Cahier de La Renaissance Vaudoise, 1967. reprinted : Bernard Campiche, 1995.Portrait des Vaudois, 1969. Collection Babel N°20Feux d'orées, 1984 ; reprinted. Bernard Campiche, 1995.Dans la buée de ses yeux, Bernard Campiche, 1995.L'imparfait, Bernard Campiche, 1996.De l'encre et du papier, La Bibliothèque des arts, 2001 (Pergamine)

Children booksLe Renard qui disait non à la lune, Grasset, 1974.Marie et le chat sauvage, Grasset, 1979.Neuf, l'œuf, Grasset, 1990.François dans la forêt, Grasset, 1991.

 Editorials 
Charles-Albert Cingria, Seghers, Paris, 1967. reprinted: Poche Suisse, 2007.Les saintes Écritures, Bertil Galland, 1972.Bréviaire, Bertil Galland, 1976.Adieu à Gustave Roud, with Maurice Chappaz and Philippe Jaccottet, Bertil Galland, 1977.Entretiens avec Jacques Chessex, Jérôme Garcin, La Différence, 1979.Maupassant et les autres, Ramsay, Paris, 1981.Flaubert, ou Le Désert en abîme, Grasset, 1991.Avez-vous déjà giflé un rat?, Bernard Campiche, 1997.Le désir de dieu, Grasset, 2005.Le simple préserve l'énigme, Gallimard, 2008.

 Editorials on painting La Muerte y la Nada (Antonio Saura), Pierre Canova, Pully, 1990.
 Zao Wou-Ki, Galerie Jan Krugier, Genève, 1990.Marcel Poncet, La Bibliothèque des Arts, Lausanne, 1992.
 Olivier Charles", Musée Jenisch, Vevey, 1992.
Bazaine, Skira, Paris, 1996.
Figures de la métamorphose, La Bibliothèque des Arts, 1999.
Le dernier des monstres (Saura), Cuadernos del Hocinoco, Cuenca, 2000.
Notes sur Saura, Cuadernos del Hocinoco, 2001.
Les dangers de Jean Lecoultre,Cuadernos del Hocinoco, 2002.
 Javier Pagola, Cuadernos del Hocinoco, 2004.
Thomas Fougeirol, Operae, 2004.
 Dans la peinture de Sarto, Atelier de St-Prex et Chabloz, Lausanne, 2008.
Une nuit dans la forêt illustrations by Manuel Müller, Notari, Genève,  2009.
Jean Lecoultre ou la haine de la peinture, in Artpassions, n°19, 2009.

Honours 
 Arts et des Lettres
 Legion of Honour

References

External links
 Literary estate of Jacques Chessex in the archive database HelveticArchives of the Swiss National Library
 Publications by and about Jacques Chessex  in the catalogue Helveticat of the Swiss National Library

1934 births
2009 deaths
People from Payerne
Swiss writers in French
Swiss male novelists
Swiss male poets
20th-century Swiss painters
20th-century male artists
Swiss male painters
21st-century Swiss painters
21st-century male artists
Prix Goncourt winners
Prix Goncourt de la Poésie winners
Grand prix Jean Giono recipients
20th-century Swiss poets
20th-century male writers
20th-century Swiss novelists
Chevaliers of the Légion d'honneur
Commandeurs of the Ordre des Arts et des Lettres
Collège Saint-Michel alumni